The plumbeous tyrant (Knipolegus cabanisi) is a species of bird in the family Tyrannidae.  It is found in southeastern Peru, western Bolivia and northern Argentina.  Its natural habitat is subtropical or tropical moist montane forests.  This and the Jelski's black tyrant are sometimes considered conspecific, in which case, the bird is then usually referred to as the Andean tyrant.

References

Hosner, P. A. and R. G. Moyle. 2012. A molecular phylogeny of black-tyrants (Tyrannidae: Knipolegus) reveals strong geographic patterns and homoplasy in plumage and display behavior.  Auk 129: 156–167.
 

plumbeous tyrant
Birds of the Yungas
plumbeous tyrant